Geraldine Hickey is an Australian comedian, known for her work as co-host of the Breakfasters program on Melbourne community radio station 3RRR. 

At the 2021 Melbourne International Comedy Festival, Hickey's "What A Surprise" show was awarded the most outstanding show. She had previously been nominated for the same award for "Things Are Going Well" in 2019.

Career

Stand Up
Hickey's stand up career emerged from her participation in the 2001 RAW Comedy Festival which took her from her hometown of Albury to Melbourne. She competed in the national finals and was runner-up, giving her exposure and a base from which to build a career. 16 years later, Hickey returns to the Raw Comedy finals as co-host. She is a veteran of the Melbourne International Comedy Festival and among her regular stand up appearances has performed at the Melbourne Fringe Festival

Radio
Hickey got her start in radio hosting 3RRR's all-female sports show The Downlow. Her popularity saw the station appoint her as co-host of the Breakfasters in 2016.

Television
Hickey has appeared on The Project, Tonightly with Tom Ballard, Have You Been Paying Attention? and Hughesy, We Have a Problem.

Hickey starred as Dr Stephanie Huddleston in 8-part comedy series Metro Sexual on the Nine Network in 2019 and reprised the role in series 2 for 9GO! and OUTtv.

References

External links
 
 Radio 3RRR Bio
 Website
 Geraldine Hickey episodes at the Little Dum Dum Club

Australian women comedians
Living people
Australian stand-up comedians
People from Albury, New South Wales
Australian radio presenters
Australian LGBT comedians
Australian women radio presenters
1979 births